Christopher Peter Skelley  (born 9 August 1993) is a British Paralympic judoka who competes in the visually impaired under 100 kg category. In 2016 it was announced that he has been selected to represent Great Britain at the 2016 Summer Paralympics in Rio. In 2021 Chris became Paralympic champion after winning Gold in the -100 kg category in the Tokyo Paralympics.

Personal history
Skelley was born in Nottingham and raised in Swindon. As a youth he was a keen athlete and enjoyed many sports playing rugby for Hull Ionians. After leaving school he took a job at a local garage, but it was noticed that his eyesight was deteriorating. He was diagnosed with ocular albinism. Skelley is married to Louise Hunt.

Judo career
Skelley took up judo as a sport at the age of five. A successful judoka, he was already part of the England squad when his eyesight began to fail. He slowly began to focus more on his judo and was brought onto the Great Britain visually impaired team. Competing in the under 100 kg category, Skelley took three bronze medals at the under-20 national tournament between 2010 and 2013. In 2014 he represented his country at the Scottish Open, taking gold in his division. The same year he won silver in the Welsh Senior Open.

In December 2015 Skelley represented Britain at the IBSA European Judo Championship in Portugal. There he missed out on the final after being beaten by a last second yuko scoring throw by his Russian opponent Abdula Kuramagomedov, the current world champion. Skelley secured the bronze by beating Ibrahim Bolukbasi of Turkey. In February 2016 Skelly was selected as part of a four-man to compete for Great Britain at the 2016 Summer Paralympics in Rio, along with Sam Ingram, Jack Hodgson and Jonathan Drane. In the build-up to the Games, Skelley and his three team-mates travelled to Rio in early March to take part in a Judo Grand Prix competition. Skelley took bronze in his match in a contest which featured many of the competitors who had already qualified for the Summer Paralympics.

Skelley was appointed Member of the Order of the British Empire (MBE) in the 2022 New Year Honours for services to judo.

References

1993 births
Living people
Sportspeople from Nottingham
Sportspeople from Kingston upon Hull
English male judoka
Paralympic judoka of Great Britain
Judoka at the 2016 Summer Paralympics
Judoka at the 2020 Summer Paralympics
Medalists at the 2020 Summer Paralympics
Paralympic gold medalists for Great Britain
Members of the Order of the British Empire